Gosta may refer to:

Barankinya Gosta (1935–1998), prominent Zimbabwean Chewa sculptor
Gosta Green, area in the city of Birmingham, England
Gosta River, tributary of the Valea Padeşului River in Romania
Predrag Gosta (born 1972), Serbian-born conductor, harpsichordist and baritone

See also
Gösta (disambiguation)